Franklin Crawford "Frank" Green (born May 5, 1933) is an American former sport shooter who competed in the 1964 Summer Olympics.  He won 2 gold medals in the 1963 Pan-Am Games in pistol shooting. He won another Pan-American Games gold medal in 1967 as a member of the team which won the free pistol-team match. He was the 1968 US free-pistol champion. He was National Rifle Association national pistol champion in 1968.  He held several patents and manufactured the Green Free-Pistol manufactured under the name Electroarms.

Green was born in Chicago, Illinois.

References

1933 births
Living people
American male sport shooters
United States Distinguished Marksman
ISSF pistol shooters
Shooters at the 1964 Summer Olympics
Olympic silver medalists for the United States in shooting
Sportspeople from Chicago
Medalists at the 1964 Summer Olympics
Pan American Games medalists in shooting
Pan American Games gold medalists for the United States
Shooters at the 1963 Pan American Games
Shooters at the 1967 Pan American Games
Medalists at the 1963 Pan American Games
20th-century American people
21st-century American people